José Suárez (19 September 1919 – 6 August 1981) was a Spanish film actor.

Career
José Suárez made his debut in a short role in Altar Mayor (1944), a very conventional film, whose director, Gonzalo Delgrás, had paid attention to him in his work as a train conductor in Asturias. He played increasingly important roles in following Delgrás's movies and by 1948 he was already a lead actor.

He then became very popular in Spain along the late 40s and early 50s, as one of the main heartthrobs of the Spanish cinema, along with his contemporaries Francisco Rabal, Jorge Mistral and Alfredo Mayo. Nevertheless, he performed remarkably in three outstanding dramas, namely Brigada criminal (1950), Condenados (1953) and Así es Madrid (1953), in the screen version of Buero Vallejo`s most famous play, Historia de una escalera (1950), and in the historical superproduction (for Spanish standards) Alba de América (Dawn of America, 1951), playing King Fernando el Católico. He portrayed Zorro in the film La montaña sin ley (Lawless mountain) (1953), making him the first Spanish actor in the role. He also co-starred with the popular Andalusian gipsy singer and dancer Lola Flores in La danza de los deseos (1954), directed by the most prestigious veteran Spanish film-maker, Florián Rey. In 1955 he co-starred Señora Ama with the Mexican and Hollywood star Dolores del Río.

In 1956, his lead role in the internationally acclaimed Calle Mayor (undoubtedly his best role, his best performance and his best film, although he always preferred Condenados) provided him with the opportunity to work in Italy with well-known film directors as Luigi Zampa in The Magistrate, starring with Claudia Cardinale, and Francesco Rosi in La sfida, starring with Rosanna Schiaffino, while he gradually lost his popularity in his home country, despite still appearing in the 60s in some interesting Spanish movies, such as A tiro limpio (1963) or  La boda (1964).

Despite appearing too in two successful mainstream Italian films: Scano Boa (1961) and Sette uomini d'oro (1965), eventually he was almost confined to the Spanish-Italian sword and sandal and spaghetti westerns movies, the most interesting of all them being The Price of Power (1969), also known as Il Prezzo del potere or La Muerte de un Presidente. And he even played the lead in El Llanero (1964), one of the first films directed by the (in)famous master of the sexually charged horror films, Jesús Franco.

In the 70's he played too for the National Spanish television in a few series, including a Spanish-Italian coproduction on the life of Cristóbal Colón.

His last film was La trastienda (1975), an artistically dispensable but sociologically significant Spanish picture, coincident with the end of Franco era in Spain.

Suárez was for many years president of the Spanish Actors Union.

He died of natural causes on August 6, 1981, in Moreda, Asturias.

Selected filmography

1944: Altar mayor - José
1947: Gold and Ivory - Manolo
1947: Trece onzas de oro
1948: Un viaje de novios
1948: La muralla feliz - David Aguirre
1950: La niña de Luzmela
1950: Child of the Night - Darío
1950: Historia de una escalera - Fernando
1950: Nobody's Wife - Juan Bautista Nebot
1950: Criminal Brigade - Fernando Olmos Sánchez
1951: Dawn of America - Rey Fernando el Católico
1952: Spanish Serenade - Pablo
1953: Aquel hombre de Tánger
1953: Bronce y luna
1953: La montaña sin ley - Zorro
1953: Such is Madrid - Antonio
1953: Condenados - Juan
1954: An Impossible Crime - Inspector Alberto Bassano
1954: Eleven Pairs of Boots - Ignacio Ariza
1954: La Danza de los deseos - Juan Antonio
1955: Señora Ama - Feliciano
1955: El hombre que veía la muerte
1955: Tres melodías de amor
1956: Calle mayor - Juan
1957: The Battalion in the Shadows - Pepe
1957: Le belle dell'aria - Mario Toselli
1958: The Italians They Are Crazy - Pieroni
1958: La sfida - Vito Polara
1959: Diego Corrientes - Diego Corrientes
1959: Il magistrato - Prosecutor Andrea Morandi
1960: Cartagine in fiamme - Hiram
1960: Un bruto para Patricia - Andrés Fernández
1961: Scano Boa - Baroncello
1963: Slave Girls of Sheba - Omar
1963: El globo azul1963: El llanero - José Mendoza
1964: A tiro limpio - Román Avelino Campos
1964: La Boda1964: Rueda de sospechosos - Comisario Luis Lozano
1965: Sette uomini d'oro - Bank Manager
1966: Agent X-77 Orders to Kill - Franck
1966: Texas, Adios - Cisco Delgado
1967: El Primer cuartel - Capitan Fernando Martín del castillo
1967: Mister Dynamit - morgen küßt Euch der Tod - General Burch
1968: Maria Isabel - Ricardo Robles
1969: Bootleggers - Engineer
1969: El Taxi de los conflictos - Guardia en puerta de comisaría
1969: Il Pistolero dell'Ave Maria - General Juan Carrasco
1969: La muerte de un presidente - Vice President Chester A. Arthur 
1970: Cateto a babor - Comandante
1970: El amor de María Isabel - Ricardo Robles
1970: El mejor del mundo - Paco Vélez
1971: El Cristo del Océano - Don Eustaquio
1971: Los jóvenes amantes1971: La Montaña rebelde - Damasio
1972: María1972 Marianela - Dr. Golfín
1972 A Reason to Live, a Reason to Die - maggiore Charles Ballard
1974 Los Caballeros del Botón de Ancla - Director de la escuela naval
1975: La Trastienda'' - Don Pablo

See also
 Cinema of Spain

References

Bibliography

External links

José Suárez in CinéArtistes.com (in French)

1919 births
1981 deaths
People from Oviedo
Actors from Asturias
Spanish male film actors
Spanish military personnel of the Spanish Civil War (National faction)
Male Spaghetti Western actors
Spanish male television actors
20th-century Spanish male actors